Josef Šváb (born 8 June 1933) is a Czech former sports shooter. He competed in the 25 metre pistol event at the 1960 Summer Olympics.

References

1933 births
Living people
Czech male sport shooters
Olympic shooters of Czechoslovakia
Shooters at the 1960 Summer Olympics
Sportspeople from Plzeň